Dame Ann Elizabeth Bowtell  (née Kewell; born 25 April 1938) is a British retired civil servant. She was the UK's First Civil Service Commissioner from 1993 to 1995.

Early life and education 
Bowtell was born in 1938 to John Albert Kewell and Olive Rose Sims.

Bowtell was educated at Kendrick Girls' School in Reading. She studied Economics at Girton College, University of Cambridge, where she was made an honorary fellow in 1997.

In 1961, she married Michael John Bowtell. They have two sons and two daughters.

References

External links

 Civil Service Commissioners

1938 births
Alumni of Girton College, Cambridge
British civil servants
Dames Commander of the Order of the Bath
Fellows of Girton College, Cambridge
Living people